

The Great Hinckley Fire was a conflagration in the pine forests of the U.S. state of Minnesota in September 1894, which burned an area of at least  (perhaps more than ), including the town of Hinckley. The official death count was 418; the actual number of fatalities was likely higher. Other sources put the death toll at 476.

Description
After a two-month summer drought, combined with very high temperatures, several small fires started in the pine forests of Pine County, Minnesota. The fires' spread apparently was due to the then-common method of lumber harvesting, wherein trees were stripped of their branches in place; these branches littered the ground with flammable debris. Also contributing was a temperature inversion that trapped the gases from the fires. The scattered blazes united into a firestorm. The temperature rose to at least . Barrels of nails melted into one mass, and in the yards of the Eastern Minnesota Railroad, the wheels of the cars fused with the rails. Some residents escaped by climbing into wells, ponds, or the Grindstone River. Others clambered aboard two crowded trains that pulled out of the threatened town minutes ahead of the fire.

James Root, an engineer on a train heading south from Duluth, rescued nearly 300 people by backing up a train nearly five miles to Skunk Lake, where the passengers escaped the fire. William Best was an engineer on a train sent specifically to evacuate people.

According to the Hinckley Fire Museum:
Because of the dryness of the summer, fires were common in the woods, along railroad tracks and in logging camps where loggers would set fire to their slash to clean up the area before moving on. Some loggers, of course left their debris behind, giving any fire more fuel on which to grow. To add to the problem, the temperature inversion that day added to the heat, smoke and gases being held down by the huge layer of cool air above. The two fires managed to join together to make one large fire with flames that licked through the inversion finding the cool air above. That air came rushing down into the fires to create a vortex or tornado of flames which then began to move quickly and grew larger and larger turning into a fierce firestorm. The fire first destroyed the towns of Mission Creek and Brook Park before coming into the town of Hinckley. When it was over the Firestorm had completely destroyed six towns, and over  lay black and smoldering. The firestorm was so devastating that it lasted only four hours but destroyed everything in its path.

Aftermath
The fire destroyed the town of Hinckley (which at the time had a population of over 1,400) as well as the smaller nearby settlements of Mission Creek, Brook Park, Sandstone, Miller, Partridge and Pokegama.

The exact number of fatalities is difficult to determine. The official coroner's report counted 413 dead while the fire's official monument notes 418. An unknown number of Native Americans and backcountry dwellers were also killed in the fire; bodies continued to be found years later. Along with the 1918 Cloquet Fire (where 453 were killed) it is one of the deadliest in Minnesota history.

Memorials

Today, a  section of the Willard Munger State Trail, from Hinckley to Barnum, is a memorial to the fire and the devastation it caused. In the town of Hinckley, on Highway 61, the Hinckley Fire Museum is located in the former Northern Pacific Railway depot. It is located a few feet north of the former depot, which burned down in the fire. It is open from May 1 until the end of October.

Lutheran Memorial Cemetery in Hinckley has a historical marker and granite obelisk as a memorial to those who perished in the fire. 248 residents of Hinckley perished in the fire and are buried in a mass grave at this cemetery. Some are unidentified.

The Brook Park Cemetery on County Road 126, south of Minnesota State Highway 23, has an historical marker plaque and a memorial to the 23 fire victims of Brook Park, with a tall obelisk on top of a granite marker.

Boston Corbett
Thomas P. "Boston" Corbett, the Union soldier who killed John Wilkes Booth after Booth's assassination of Abraham Lincoln, is presumed to have died in the fire. His last known residence is believed to have been a forest settlement near Hinckley, and a "Thomas Corbett" is listed as one of the dead or missing.

See also
 Baudette fire of 1910
 Cloquet fire of 1918
 Peshtigo Fire of 1871

References

Further reading

External links
 
 
 

Pine County, Minnesota
Wildfires in Minnesota
1894 natural disasters in the United States
1894 fires in the United States
1894 in Minnesota
19th-century wildfires